Dalbergia eremicola is a species of legume in the family Fabaceae.
It is found in Kenya and Somalia.

References

Sources

eremicola
Flora of Kenya
Flora of Somalia
Near threatened plants
Taxonomy articles created by Polbot